Varnja is a small borough in Peipsiääre Parish, Tartu County, in northeastern Estonia. As of 2011 Census, the settlement's population was 171.

Gallery

References

Boroughs and small boroughs in Estonia
Kreis Dorpat